Ricardo Guedes Moseque (born 2 November 1972) is a Uruguayan cyclist. He competed in the men's individual road race at the 1996 Summer Olympics. In 2015 and 2016, Guedes finished in second place at the Uruguayan National Road Race Championships.

Major results

1996
 1st Stage 6 Rutas de America
2002
 1st Stage 7 Rutas de America
2005
 6th Overall Vuelta del Uruguay
2009
 2nd Overall Vuelta del Uruguay
2015
 2nd Road race, National Road Championships
2016
 2nd Road race, National Road Championships

References

External links

1972 births
Living people
Uruguayan male cyclists
Olympic cyclists of Uruguay
Cyclists at the 1996 Summer Olympics
Place of birth missing (living people)